Artur Bugaj (born 1970), Polish football player
Krzysztof Kamil Baczyński, nom de guerre: Jan Bugaj
 (born 1950) Polish orchestra conductor and music educator 
Roman Bugaj (born 1973), Polish heavyweight boxer
Ryszard Bugaj (born 1944), Polish economist and politician, MP

See also
 
Bugajski

Polish-language surnames